Straight Shooter may refer to:

Straight Shooter (Bad Company album), 1975
Straight Shooter (James Gang album), 1972
"Straight Shooter", a song by The Mamas & the Papas from the album If You Can Believe Your Eyes and Ears
Straight Shooter (1939 film), an American film directed by Sam Newfield
Straight Shooter (1999 film), a German film directed by Thomas Bohn
Joe Bowman (marksman) (1925–2009), American marksman known as "The Straight Shooter"